The Moller Villa (Male zhuzhai, 马勒住宅), located at .30 South Shanxi Road in the French Concession area of Shanghai, China, is a colonial-era mansion. The villa was built by Eric Moller, a Swedish shipping magnate, in 1936. The distinctive design includes brown-tiled Gothic and Tudor gables, spires, and steeples.

In 2001, the Hengshan Group began to renovate to the villa, preserving its original architectural style. The building now houses a hotel.

History
Sovereign Eric Moller came to live in Shanghai in 1919. Much of Eric Moller's estate was inherited from his father, Nils Moller, who began a shipbuilding business in the 1860s in British Hong Kong. The Moller family business mainly focused on ships and shipbuilding, although later they ventured into real estate and insurance. The company has been operating successfully in Hong Kong until the 1990s. Arrived in Shanghai, Eric Moller works in maritime transport, also earning big sums of money in horse racing that he reinvests on farms. He was a member of the Board of Directors of the City's Jockey Club.

See also
 Former Residence of Sun Yat-sen, Shanghai
 Song Ching Ling Memorial Residence in Shanghai
 Major National Historical and Cultural Sites (Shanghai)

References

External links

Houses completed in 1936
Hotel buildings completed in 2001
1936 establishments in China
2001 establishments in China
Houses in Shanghai
Hotels in Shanghai
Major National Historical and Cultural Sites in Shanghai